Philippine Engelhard (21 October 1756 – 28 September 1831), was a German poet. She was one of the so-called Universitätsmamsellen, a group of five academically active women during the 18th-and 19th century, daughters of academics on Göttingen University, alongside Meta Forkel-Liebeskind, Caroline Schelling, Therese Huber, and Dorothea Schlözer.

Sources 
 Eckart Kleßmann: Universitätsmamsellen. Fünf aufgeklärte Frauen zwischen Rokoko, Revolution und Romantik. Die Andere Bibliothek Bd. 281. Eichborn, Frankfurt am Main 2008, 

1756 births
1831 deaths
German women poets
18th-century German women writers
18th-century German poets
19th-century German women writers
19th-century German poets